Garalo is a small town and rural commune in the Cercle of Bougouni in the Sikasso Region of southern Mali.

The commune contains 30 settlements:

Banko
Dialakoro
Djine
Fara
Farabale Zena
Foulalaba
Garalo
Golobala
Kerekoumana
Kodiougou
Kotie
Koura
N'Gouako
Nagnola
Ngouana
Ouenasokoro
Paniala
Sena
Sienre
Sienrou
Sirakole
Sirankourou
Sirantjila
Sola Bougouda
Solaba
Soronakolobe
Tabakorole
Tanhala
Tiekoumala
Tienko

References

Communes of Sikasso Region